Duan Fang (born 26 December 1994) is a Chinese volleyball player.

Playing career
She participated at the 2015 FIVB Volleyball Women's U23 World Championship, 2018 Montreux Volley Masters, 2018 FIVB Volleyball Women's Nations League, 2018 Asian Games, and 2019 Montreux Volley Masters.

Clubs 

  Liaoning (2013 - present)

References

External links 

 FIVB profile
 http://www.fivb.org/viewPressRelease.asp?No=56113&Language=en#.W5LOdkZKjIU

1994 births
Living people
Chinese women's volleyball players
Wing spikers
Asian Games gold medalists for China
Asian Games medalists in volleyball
Medalists at the 2018 Asian Games
Volleyball players at the 2018 Asian Games
21st-century Chinese women